Cherry Lane Township is one of seven townships in Alleghany County, North Carolina, United States. The township had a population of 1,528 according to the 2010 census.

Cherry Lane Township occupies  in southeastern Alleghany County. The township's eastern border is with Surry County, and the southern border is with Wilkes County. There are no incorporated municipalities within the township. Unincorporated communities include Cherry Lane and Roaring Gap.

References

Townships in Alleghany County, North Carolina
Townships in North Carolina